Top Trumps Adventures: Dogs and Dinosaurs is a video game for the DS, PC and PlayStation 2 consoles, based on the popular Top Trumps card game. It was published by Ubisoft. This release is the sister title to Top Trumps Adventures: Horror and Predators, and is part of the Top Trumps Adventures series.

Gameplay
The player assumes the role of one of two fictional siblings, a girl named Bex or a boy named Matt. The gameplay revolves around playing virtual games of Top Trumps based on the Dogs and Dinosaurs decks.

The majority of the game is based on one-on-one battles between the two characters, one of which will be controlled by the computer. The game plays similarly to regular Top Trumps games, apart from the use of special powers and abilities. These are chosen at the beginning of each battle and can be used to gain an advantage in the game. In addition, the 'Quiz' mode tests players' knowledge of the cards they are using.

Success in the game unlocks trophies, medals and cards.

See also
Top Trumps
Top Trumps: Doctor Who
Top Trumps Adventures: Horror and Predators
Top Trumps Adventures

References

2007 video games
Nintendo DS games
PlayStation 2 games
Windows games
Top Trumps
Eidos Interactive games
Video games developed in the United Kingdom